William Holmes Cookman (1867–1950) was an American architect who was a staff architect and engineer of the Pennsylvania Railroad from about 1894 to the 1930s. Cookman graduated from the University of Pennsylvania in 1887. He was listed in Philadelphia city directories as a salesman or an artist from 1887 to 1890, and from 1891 to 1893 as a draftsman. From 1894 through 1930 he was listed as an architect. He began working for the Pennsylvania Railroad by 1901. He became a member of the Philadelphia Chapter of the American Institute of Architects in 1912. Cookman was a member of the American Railway Engineering Association, and served on the Association's Standing Committee VI. Buildings in 1914.

Works
 Chester Station, 6th & Welsh Streets, Chester, Pennsylvania, 1903
 Pennsylvania Railroad Station, Dover, Delaware, 1911
 Greensburg Station, Harrison Avenue and Seton Hill Drive, Greensburg, Pennsylvania,1912
Pennsylvania Railroad North Philadelphia Station, Philadelphia (remodel, 1912)
 Cumberland Valley Railroad station and office building, Chambersburg, Pennsylvania
 Pennsylvania Railroad Edmondson Station, Edmondson Avenue at North Bentalou Street, Baltimore, Maryland
 Pennsylvania Railroad Chelten Avenue Station, Chelten Avenue and Pulaski Street, Philadelphia, Pennsylvania,1918, demolished and replaced 1958
 Pennsylvania Railroad Station, Mayville, New York, 1925
 Pennsylvania Railroad South Philadelphia Perishable Products Terminal Building, Oregon and South Delaware Avenues, South Philadelphia, Pennsylvania, 1928

Gallery

References

19th-century American architects
American railway architects
Pennsylvania Railroad people
20th-century American architects
University of Pennsylvania alumni
1867 births
1950 deaths